A list of films produced by the Marathi language film industry based in Maharashtra scheduled for release in the year 2016.

Box office collection

January – March

April – June

July – September

October – December

References

External links

2016
Marathi
2016 in Indian cinema